Laukkanen is a Finnish surname. Notable people with the surname include:

Janne Laukkanen (born 1970), Finnish former professional ice hockey player
Jari Laukkanen (disambiguation), multiple people
Jenna Laukkanen (born 1995), Finnish swimmer
Juha Laukkanen (born 1969), former Finnish javelin thrower
Kai Laukkanen (born 1975), Finnish motorcycle speedway rider
Kari Laukkanen (born 1963), former Finnish football goalkeeper
Mari Laukkanen (born 1987), Finnish biathlete and cross-country skier
Noora Laukkanen (born 1993), Finnish swimmer
Tapio Laukkanen (born 1969),  Finnish rally driver
Teuvo Laukkanen (1919 – 2011), Finnish cross-country skier

Finnish-language surnames